The Caribbean Cup, established in 1989, was the championship tournament for national association football teams that are members of the Caribbean Football Union.

Qualifying tournament

Preliminary round

Group A

Group B

Group C 

 withdrew

Group D 
 withdrew, leaving British Virgin Islands and Montserrat to compete.

Group E 

 and  both withdrew.

Qualifying round

Group 1

Group 2

Group 3

Group 4

Group 5 
 Saint-Martin withdrew

Final tournament

Group 1

Group 2

Semi-finals 

The match was postponed from June 10 due to bad lighting.

Third-place match 

The third place playoff was cancelled due to the condition of the field. Third place was shared between Jamaica and Haiti.

Final

Result 

Trinidad and Tobago qualified for the 2000 Gold Cup

Awards 
 Most Valuable Player
 Raciel Martinez

 Top Goalscorer
 Ariel Álvarez (five goals)

 Top Goalkeeper
 Clayton Ince

 Fair Play Trophy:

Top goalscorers 
Five goals
  Ariel Álvarez

Four goals

  Peter Prosper
  Ray Graham

Three goals

  Wilson Chevalier
  Stern John
  Stokley Mason

Two goals

  Luis Marten
  Damas-Agis Patrice
  Jason Roberts
  Patrick Tardieu
  Mickey Trotman
  Angus Eve
  Arnold Dwarika

External links 
 CONCACAF

Caribbean Cup
Caribbean Cup
1999 in Trinidad and Tobago football
International association football competitions hosted by Trinidad and Tobago